Michael J. O'Brien (born May 4, 1939) is an American politician in the state of Iowa.

O'Brien was born in Shenandoah, Iowa. He attended Iowa State University and the University of Northern Iowa and was a teacher. A Democrat, he served in the Iowa House of Representatives from 1993 to 2003 (79th district).

References

1939 births
Living people
People from Shenandoah, Iowa
Iowa State University alumni
University of Northern Iowa alumni
Educators from Iowa
Republican Party members of the Iowa House of Representatives